Kangpokpi (Meitei pronunciation:/kāng-pōk-pī/), also known as Kanggui, is the headquarter of Kangpokpi district and the Sadar Hills Autonomous District Council in the Indian state of Manipur. 

Kangpokpi is mainly inhabited by the Thadou-Kuki, Mao Naga, Poumai Naga, Liangmai Naga, Thangal Naga, and Nepali speaking people. Thadou-Kuki is the main language spoken in this town with significant populations also speaking Thangal, Mao, Poumai, Liangmai and Nepali. There is also a group of people from other states like Bihar and Uttar Pradesh, to start their own businesses. Most of the grocery stores and other small businesses are owned by these migrants from other parts of India. Kanggui is a full-fledged township with all sorts of amenities and facilities available for daily needs.

Kanggui has two hospitals, one government and one private. There are approximately 20 schools, with two high schools offering computer education. It is the site of a new branch campus of Indira Gandhi National Tribal University. It has two colleges, Kanggui College and Manipur Theological College.

The major newspaper of the town is Eimi Times. Jingvalpa, a monthly magazine in Thadou-Kuki, is printed in Kanggui. The people of the township also has mobile news service facility that ensures better connectivity and effective spreading of information.

Administration
The administration of Kanggui rest in the hands of following offices/leaders:-
The Deputy Commissioner 
The Additional Deputy Commissioner (General responsibilities)
The Chairman/Secretary, Sadar Hills Autonomous District Council (Social responsibility)
The Additional Superintendent of Police/Officer in charge/ The Commander, Assam Rifles (law and order) 
The Chairman/Secretary/Members (elected) of KangguiTown Committee (local responsibility)
The Kangpokpi Youth Union, Kangpokpi Women Welfare Union, Sadar Hills Women Union, Mothers Union (Kanggui area), Kuki Inpi, Kanggui Churches, K.S.O (Sadar Hills), social organisation and Mrs. Nemcha Kipgen, MLA Kanggui constituency.

The town banks with the State Bank of India with an ATM and Manipur State Cooperative Bank with two registered NBFC's offering financial services to its inhabitants. It has a police station under the supervision of the Additional Superintendent of Police. Kanggui also has a sports complex.  Kanggui also has an Internet facilities provided by BSNL.  Recently many new complexes have been built and old ones upgraded as the town and district developing at a high rate of growth. The town is booming despite minimal assistance from the state government. Kanggui also boasts of large music production.
 
The town is in news recently for being the epicentre of the demand to upgrade Sadar Hills Autonomous District to a full-fledged District status. The demand is spearheaded by the Sadar Hills District-hood Demand Committee (SHDDC) with the utmost support of K.S.O, women wings, youth wings and the village/town chairman of Sadar Hills.

Geography
It is located at an elevation of 1000 m above sea level.

Religion

Location 

The National Highway 39 passes through Kangpokpi. Imphal-Tamenglong road bisects the town in the center. Many private buses connect the state capital, Imphal and Kangpokpi. The town is well connected to Tamenglong district through Imphal-Tamenglong road (IT road) which begins at Kanggui. Kanggui is a major trading centre for agriculture products which are transported to the rest of the state via the IT Road.

Notes

References

External links
 Satellite map of Kangpokpi
 About Kangpokpi

Cities and towns in Kangpokpi district
Villages in Sadar Hills
Kuki tribes